Assisted suicide is suicide with the aid of another person. In the United States, the term "assisted suicide" is typically used to describe what proponents refer to as medical aid in dying, in which terminally ill adults are prescribed and self-administer barbiturates if they feel that they are suffering significantly. The term is often used interchangeably with physician-assisted suicide (PAS), "physician-assisted dying", "physician-assisted death", "assisted death" and "medical aid in dying" (MAiD).

Assisted suicide is similar to but distinct from euthanasia (sometimes called "mercy killing"). In cases of euthanasia, another party acts to bring about the person's death in order to end ongoing suffering. In cases of assisted suicide, a second person provides the means through which the individual is able to voluntarily end their own life, but they do not directly cause the individual's death.

Physician-assisted suicide, or "medical aid in dying" is legal in eleven jurisdictions: California, Colorado, District of Columbia, Hawaii, Montana, Maine, New Jersey, New Mexico, Oregon, Vermont, and Washington. These laws (excluding Montana since there is no law) expressly state that "actions taken in accordance with [the Act] shall not, for any purpose, constitute suicide, assisted suicide, mercy killing or homicide, under the law". This distinguishes the legal act of "medical aid in dying" from the act of helping someone die by suicide, which is prohibited by statute in 42 states and prohibited by common law in an additional six states and the District of Columbia. 
A 2018 poll by Gallup displayed that a solid majority of Americans, with 72 percent in favor, support laws allowing patients to seek the assistance of a physician in ending their life. Nevertheless, assisted suicide remains illegal in a majority of states across the nation.

In 2022, the state of Oregon ruled it unconstitutional to refuse assisted suicide to people from other states who are willing to travel to Oregon to die that way, effectively giving out of state residents the opportunity to die by physician-assisted suicide.  Before someone travels to Oregon to die by physician assisted suicide, those helping the patient travel to Oregon might be prosecuted for assisting a suicide. After the barbiturates are acquired, if the patient returns to their home state, those assisting with mixing the fatal dose of barbiturates may be prosecuted for assisting a suicide.

History

Early movements
The first significant drive to legalize assisted suicide in the United States arose in the early years of the twentieth century. In a 2004 article in the Bulletin of the History of Medicine, Brown University historian Jacob M. Appel documented extensive political debate over legislation to legalize physician-assisted death in Iowa and Ohio in 1906.

In Ohio, the legislation was inspired by the campaign of heiress Anna Sophina Hall, whose mother had died a long, drawn-out, painful death from liver cancer. Despite Hall's efforts, the bill was rejected by the Ohio legislature by a vote of 79 to 23.

Glucksberg v. Washington
Dr. Harold Glucksberg, in 1994, along with four other physicians, three terminally ill patients, and Compassion and Dying, brought a case against the state of Washington for banning assisted suicide. The case was filed in District Court in 1994.

Following a series of appeals, the U.S. Supreme Court decided in 1997 in a unanimous decision to uphold Washington's ban. They cited the Due Process Clause and argued that assisted suicide is not guaranteed as a fundamental liberty protected by due process. The case allowed individual states to decide independently on the medical aid-in-dying issue. It set the stage for legislative efforts on the state level to either permit or ban physician-assisted suicide.

Dr. Kevorkian

Assisted suicide in the United States was brought to public attention in the 1990s with the highly publicized case of Dr. Jack Kevorkian. Kevorkian assisted over 40 people in committing suicide in Michigan.  His first public assisted suicide was in 1990, of Janet Adkins, a 54-year-old woman diagnosed with early-onset Alzheimer's disease in 1989. He was charged with murder, but charges were dropped on December 13, 1990, because there were no Michigan laws outlawing suicide or the medical assistance of it so he was not in violation of a law.

In 1998, Kevorkian videotaped himself giving a man a lethal injection, with the patient's consent, and aired the tape on 60 Minutes. This was significantly different from previous cases, where it was always the patients themselves who reportedly completed the suicide process. He was found guilty of second-degree murder and served eight years of a 10–25 year sentence. He was released in 2007, and died on June 3, 2011.

Brittany Maynard

In 2014, the death of Brittany Maynard, an advocate for the legalization of aid in dying, from brain cancer led to renewed debate in the United States over assisted suicide, and was cited as being responsible for bills in several states on the topic. Her home state of California, which she left to reside in Oregon to access its Death With Dignity Act, became the fifth state to authorize aid in dying, in 2015.

Jurisdictions where assisted suicide is authorized

California

In 1992, the group Californians Against Human Suffering proposed Proposition 161 to allow patients with less than six months to live the right to receive assistance from physicians in dying.  This proposition offered more safeguards against abuse by physicians than Washington's Initiative 119, such as special protections for patients in nursing facilities.  This measure failed to pass with 46 percent of the vote.

Subsequent efforts were tried to pass assisted death legalization through the California State Legislature in 1999, 2005, and 2006, all of which failed. The California legislature passed the California End of Life Option Act, a bill legalizing the practice in September 2015, and the bill was signed into law by Governor Jerry Brown on October 5, 2015, making California the fifth state to authorize medical aid in dying and the second to do so through the legislature. The Act began implementation on June 9, 2016. The law went into effect in June 2016.

In May 2018, Judge Daniel A. Ottolia of the Superior Court of Riverside County ruled that the method of enacting the law was unconstitutional, but the law was reinstated by a state appeals court the following month.

Colorado
Representatives Lois Court and Joann Ginal introduced assisted suicide legislation in 2015 in the Colorado House.  The bill was voted down in committee 8–5.

In April 2016, Julie Selsberg and Jaren Ducker filed an initiative with the secretary of state seeking to authorize medical aid in dying in November 2016 through the ballot process.

On November 8, 2016, Colorado voters passed Proposition 106 making assisted death legal among patients with a terminal illness.

District of Columbia
In January 2015, D.C. Council member Mary M. Cheh introduced the Death with Dignity Act of 2015. On October 5, 2016, the D.C. Committee on Health and Human Services voted 3–2 for the Death with Dignity Act.  On November 1, 2016, the D.C. Council voted 11–2 to advance the Death with Dignity Act. It then went through another vote in the council and the Mayor's office. Mayor Bowser signed the bill on December 23, 2016. After the-30 day U.S. Congress review mandated by the federal Home Rule Act, and following the inability of Congressional Republicans to block the bill, the law went into effect on February 18, 2017, with D.C. becoming the seventh jurisdiction in the U.S. to legalize this.

Hawaii 
Since 2019, Hawaii has legally allowed assisted dying, based on the Oregon and Washington state models. Governor David Ige signed a medical aid-in-dying law on April 5, 2018. The law has safeguards to protect against abuse, including two health care providers being required to confirm a patient's diagnosis, prognosis, his or her ability to make decisions, and that the patient's request is voluntary; as well as a counselor being required to determine that the patient does not have conditions that may interfere with decision-making, such as untreated depression. The law requires that the patient must make two oral requests for the life-ending medication, with a 20-day waiting period in between, and sign a written request witnessed by two people, one of whom cannot be a relative. Criminal penalties apply to anyone attempting to coerce people into obtaining life-ending medication or tampering with said patient's request.

Maine 
The Maine Death with Dignity Act was introduced in the state legislature in 2019 by Representative Patricia Hymanson (D-York). The bill passed in the House by 73 to 72 and in the Senate by 19 to 16. On June 12, 2019, Governor Janet Mills signed the Maine Death with Dignity Act into law making Maine the ninth jurisdiction to legalize assisted suicide in the United States.

Montana 
Aid in dying is legal in Montana through a state supreme court decision. In Baxter v. Montana (2009) the Montana Supreme Court ruled in a 5–2 decision that state law allows for terminally ill Montanans to request lethal medication from a physician under existing statutes, in 2009. The Attorney General of the state of Montana sought an appeal from the Montana Supreme Court, but the court, by a decision of five to two, affirmed the lower court's ruling on the state law.  The Court did, however, limit the scope of the decision by not determining if the state's constitution protected the right.

New Jersey
A New Jersey Assembly committee voted in favor of assisted suicide legislation, and the full state Assembly voted on Assemblyman John Burzichelli's bill, known as A 2270, the New Jersey Death with Dignity Act, on November 13, 2014, although the bill failed to receive a vote in the Senate. The bill would have required patients with a terminal disease to first verbally request a prescription from their attending physician, followed by a second verbal request at least 15 days later and one request in writing signed by two witnesses. In addition, the attending physician would have to offer the patient a chance to rescind their request. Governor Chris Christie, at the time the bill was going through a legislative review and voting, vowed to veto any bills related to allowing assisted suicide.

State Senator Nicolas Scutar introduced the Aid in Dying for the Terminally Ill Act in January 2018. The bill was passed on the State Assembly on March 25, 2019, and it was signed by Governor Phil Murphy on April 12, 2019, making New Jersey the 7th state to legalize assisted suicide. The law went into effect on August 1, 2019.

New Mexico
A New Mexico court legalized the practice in Bernalillo County in January 2014; this decision was overturned on August 11, 2015, which upheld the state's ban on assisted suicide.

On April 8, 2021, Governor Michelle Lujan Grisham signed the Elizabeth Whitefield End-of-Life Options Act into law after the bill passed the New Mexico Legislature, legalizing assisted suicide in the state. The law allows for terminally ill patients with six months or less to live to request lethal medication. Two medical experts are required to agree on the patient's diagnosis and the patient must pass a mental competency screening in order to receive lethal medication. There is a 48-hour waiting period, after which the patient must take the medication themselves. The law took effect on June 18, 2021.

Oregon

Oregon voters first approved the Death with Dignity Act (DWDA) by general election in November 1994 by a margin of 51% to 49%. Ballot Measure 16, a citizen initiative sponsored by Oregon Right to Die Political Action Committee, asked if terminally ill patients with less than six months to live should be able to receive a prescription for lethal drugs and included many provisions to protect against misuse, such as two oral requests and a written request from the patient.  The patient must also be referred to counseling if a mental illness is suspected.

The law went into effect in October 1997 after an injunction delayed implementation. In November 1997, Measure 51 was placed on the general election ballot to repeal the Act. Voters chose to retain the Act by a margin of 60% to 40%.

Data from the Oregon Health Authority, which publishes annual reports on the state's first-in-the-nation assisted death law, show that approximately two-thirds of patients who receive prescriptions for lethal drugs take them.

Challenges

Lee v. State of Oregon
In December 1994, doctors and patients argued that the DWDA violated the U.S. Constitution's first and fourteenth amendments in Lee v. Oregon. U.S. District Court Judge Michael Hogan placed a temporary injunction, that he later made permanent, on the Act.

In February 1997, the Ninth Circuit Court of Appeals ruled to dismiss the challenge to the Death with Dignity Act.

Measure 51, Oregon repeal of Death with Dignity
In 1997, Measure 51 was placed on the November ballot. It failed, and 60% of Oregon voters, more than the original 1994 vote, expressed their support for the Death with Dignity Act.

Oregon v. Ashcroft
U.S. Attorney General John Ashcroft  issued a directive in 2001 to prevent the Oregon Death With Dignity Act from being implemented. The state of Oregon successfully sued and proceeded with implementation.

Vermont

In May 2013, the Vermont Legislature passed the Patient Choice and Control at End of Life Act. Governor Peter Shumlin signed it into law. The law is based on, but is less restrictive than, the Oregon model.

Vermont was the first state to pass an assisted death law through the legislative process. In January 2013 the act was introduced to the Senate, and in May 2013 it was passed by both the house and senate.

Vermont residents 18 years old or older who are mentally capable adults with a terminal illness and a prognosis of six months or less to live can make an oral request and obtain a lethal dose of medication from a physician to hasten their death. The bill requires a second opinion, written and oral requests, and other provisions.

Washington
In 1991, a ballot question asked if terminally ill adults should be allowed to receive physician aid-in-dying. The initiative failed, receiving 46 percent of the vote.

Washington voters approved the Death with Dignity Act by general election in November 2008 by a margin of 58% to 42%. "This measure would permit terminally ill, competent, adult Washington residents medically predicted to die within six months to request and self-administer lethal medication prescribed by a physician. The measure requires two oral and one written request, two physicians to diagnose the patient and determine the patient is competent, a waiting period, and physician verification of an informed patient decision. Physicians, patients, and others acting in good faith compliance would have criminal and civil immunity."

Other jurisdictions

Alaska
In 1999, two terminally ill patients, Kevin Sampson and Jane Doe, sued for an order to exempt their physicians from being charged with manslaughter for assisting them in dying.  The superior court ruled against them, and they appealed to the Alaska Supreme Court.  This court upheld the previous ruling with the reasoning that the Alaska Constitution's right to privacy and liberty does not allow terminally ill patients to be assisted by physicians in dying.

More recently, Representative Harriet Drummond (D-Anchorage) has twice introduced legislation to legalize physician assisted suicide: first in 2015 and again in 2017. In each case, the act was heard in the House Health & Social Services Committee, then was rolled over to the session for the subsequent year. In 2018, the House Health & Social Services Committee passed the bill 3 to 2, with 2 abstentions, sending it to the Judiciary Committee, where it stalled again.

Arizona
Arizona's state legislature has heard bills to legalize physician assisted suicide and patient-controlled pain medication dosing numerous times since 2003. Each year from 2017 to 2020, companion bills for assisted suicide were simultaneously introduced in the House and Senate, but failed to advance.

In 2017, the legislature passed a related law, SB 1439, Prohibition on Discrimination Against Health Care Entities, which prohibits discrimination against medical care providers who opt out of providing assistance in dying, should such care ever be legalized. It was subsequently signed by the Governor on March 24, 2017.

In Arizona, the city of Bisbee became the first municipality in the state to approve an aid in dying resolution, although the vote is not legally binding.

The resolution states that the city of Bisbee:
 Respects the diversity of perspectives of its citizens,
 Supports equal protection within the diversity of perspectives on end-of-life decisions,
 Recognizes the practice of Aid in Dying as a legitimate individual liberty,
 And, while not a legally enforceable document, urges prosecutorial discretion by the Cochise County Attorney in de-prioritizing cases involving prosecution of a person who has supported, been present, or facilitated a loved one to advance the time of his or her imminent death when facing intolerable suffering.

Connecticut
Legislation to legalize assisted suicide was first introduced in Connecticut in 1995, when Oregon considered its own policy. Similar bills have had a public hearing in seven of the last eight years (2013-2020, excepting 2016), but they consistently died in committee without coming to a vote. HB-06425, An Act Concerning Aid In Dying For Terminally Ill Patients, was evaluated by the Connecticut Public Health Committee March 5, 2021 with a 24–9 vote to send to the assembly floor, however was then referred to the Judiciary Committee and subsequently tabled.

Florida
Krischer v. McIver was a case brought to the Florida Supreme Court in 1997 by the Florida chapter of the Hemlock Society in an attempt to overturn the state's anti-assisted suicide law.  The question was if AIDS patient Charles Hall had this right, and the case was appealed to the Florida Supreme Court.  This court upheld the constitutionality of Florida's law against assisted suicide.

In 2020, State Senator Kevin Rader (D-29) introduced the first ever Florida bill to legalize physician assisted suicide, SB 1800, the Florida Death with Dignity Act. The bill was indefinitely postponed and withdrawn from consideration on March 14, 2020.

Maryland
The Maryland legislature has considered and rejected bills on physician-assisted death many times, beginning in 1995. From 2015 to 2017, an End of Life Option Act was introduced each year, but each year withdrawn without a vote. In 2019, the reintroduced act was brought to a vote. It passed the House 74–66, but failed in the Senate with a tie 23–23. In 2020, the act was once again introduced but subsequently set aside due to the COVID-19 pandemic. Governor Larry Hogan, whose term in office ended in 2023, has suggested in the past that he would oppose the legislation, but indicated in 2020 that his personal battle with cancer had changed his perspective and that he was now "open to both sides of the issue".

Massachusetts

The Massachusetts Death with Dignity Initiative, a ballot measure to legalize aid in dying, was narrowly defeated in the 2012 general election, with 51% of voters against the proposal.

A poll taken by the Boston Globe and the University of New Hampshire between September 21 and 27, 2012, found Massachusetts residents supporting Question 2 68%, with 20% opposed.  Another public poll by the University of Massachusetts and YouGov American found similar results as late as October 8 with 65% in support and 19% opposed.

Legislation to legalize physician assisted suicide was introduced numerous times in the Massachusetts House both before and after the ballot initiative, in 1995, 1997, 2009, 2011, 2012, 2013, and 2015. None of these bills moved out of committee.

In 2017, companion bills in the House and Senate were introduced on the issue, with 44 and 11 cosponsors on the respective bills, but died in committee after a joint public hearing. In 2019, a similar pair of bills was introduced by an expanded coalition of 67 cosponsors in the House and Senate. An amended version of these bills, the Massachusetts End of Life Options Act, advanced from the Joint Committee on Public Health on May 29, 2020, to the Joint Committee on Healthcare Financing, where it failed to receive a vote before the end of the 2020 legislative session on December 31.

A 2019 poll of 500 residents conducted by the Boston Globe and Suffolk University, released in 2020, found that 70% of Massachusetts residents agreed that "the terminally ill [should] be permitted to end their own lives with the help of a doctor, also known as medical aid in dying." Support for assisted suicide was similar across broad geographic regions, age brackets, and genders, but varied more by race, with stronger support among White (73%) and Black (64%) respondents, and less support from Hispanic/Latino (50%) and Asian (52%) respondents. The overall margin of error was reported as ±4.4, but higher for smaller subgroups.

New York
In 1994, a suit was filed in New York claiming that the anti-assisted suicide statute was a violation of equal protection and liberty guarantees of the Fourteenth Amendment.  This claim was rejected by the District Court on the basis that there is no right to assisted suicide given by the U.S. Constitution.  In 1996, the U.S. Court of Appeals overturned this ruling with the reasoning that the criminalization of assisted suicide violates the Equal Protection Clause.  However, the U.S. Supreme Court unanimously reversed the U.S. Court of Appeals decision in Vacco v. Quill, 521 U.S. 793 (1997).

In February 2015, New York state senators Brad Hoylman and Diane Savino introduced a "Death With Dignity Act" to allow physician-assisted suicide in the state.

On September 7, 2017, in Myers v. Schneiderman, the New York Court of Appeals held that terminally-ill persons did not possess a right to physician-assisted suicide under the New York State Constitution.

Nevada
In May 2017, a bill was passed by the state senate, which sought to legalize physician-assisted suicide. However, when passed to the Nevada Assembly, the Committee on Health and Human Services chose not to advance the bill. Similar legislation was reintroduced at the next legislative session, which took place in 2019. Although it once again passed out of committee, it was not brought to a full Senate vote before the deadline.

Tennessee
Tennessee's legislature first debated legalizing assisted suicide in 2015.
In the following year, a prominent Tennessee political figure, John Jay Hooker, took the cause to the courts by filing a lawsuit asking for physician assisted suicide. The case was in the appeals process when Hooker died of cancer on January 24, 2016.

A pair of companion bills to legalize the practice were introduced in the Tennessee House and Senate in 2017, but did not advance.

State power to allow and regulate

States have the power to regulate, allow or prohibit assisted suicide.

In 1997, in the cases of Washington v. Glucksberg and Vacco v. Quill, the U.S. Supreme Court ruled unanimously that there is no Constitutional right to assisted suicide, and that states therefore have the right to prohibit it. Advocates of assisted suicide saw this as opening the door for debate on the issue at the state level.

Gonzales v. Oregon was brought to the United States Supreme Court in 2006. The court ruled that the United States Attorney General could not enforce the federal Controlled Substances Act against physicians who prescribed drugs, in compliance with Oregon state law, for the assisted suicide of the terminally ill.

In practice
Health departments in Oregon and Washington State publicly report yearly on the use of assisted death; as required in their respective statutes.

A documentary was produced in 2011 called How to Die in Oregon which follows a woman who uses assisted death  and interviews her family and interviews opponents of the law.

Controversy
People disagree about what the practice of helping a terminally ill or disabled person die by suicide should be called. Proponents like to  call the practice "medical aid in dying" because they do not believe that killing oneself under those circumstances is wrong or unhealthy. Opponents tend to prefer the term "physician-assisted suicide (PAS)", which employs the technical terms for self (sui) killing (cide). They feel that PAS is the most accurate monker for the act of helping anyone end their own life. Like all heated debates, terms for the latter practice are subject to political framing. Proponents are more likely to use terms like "physician-assisted dying", "physician-assisted death", "aid in dying", "death with dignity", "right to die", "compassionate death", "compassionate dying", "end-of-life choice", and "medical assistance at the end of life". Opponents do not view the latter practice as a legitimate medical procedure, hence they regard the aforementioned labels as euphemisms and use the term "assisted suicide".

Controversy concerning the legalization of this practice typically arises from concerns regarding its intersection with manipulative circumstances or family members; inaccurate prognoses, the accuracy of death certificates, unequal access to healthcare, financial problems, the Werther Effect, advocacy for the practice's expansion to those with disabilities, the deaths of disabled persons in places like Canada that have occipital because of a lack of social support, evidence of abuse in other jurisdictions where PAS is authorized and ableism in general. Opponents view these factors as legitimate reasons to keep physician assisted suicide illegal.

Debate over whether assisted suicide/MAiD is suicide

Suicide refers to the act of taking one's own life. Opponents feel that this term is appropriate to describe assisted death, because of the social and personal dynamics that can pressure someone into choosing death. Opponents also cite the fact that oncologists and other non-psychiatric physicians responsible for referring patients for counseling are not trained to detect complex, potentially invisible disorders like clinical depression.

Proponents feel that "medical aid in dying" differs from suicide because a patient must be confirmed by two physicians to be terminally ill with a prognosis of 6 months or less to live and must also be confirmed by two physicians to be mentally capable to make medical decisions. That is why proponents support death certificates that list their underlying condition as the cause of death. According to the proponents, suicide is a solitary, unregulated act whereas aid in dying is medically authorized and is intended to allow for the presence of loved ones. Proponents define "suicide" as an irrational act committed in the throes of mental illness. They assert that the latter act is fundamentally distinct from the practice that they are advocating, as it is intended to be a measured act.

In contrast, opponents feel that this characterization of suicide is erroneous. They point out that people commit suicide for political reasons, for the same reasons that proponents cite as rational justifications for assisted death, and that mentally ill people who become terminally ill may experience assisted death as a potential "out" in regard to suicidal ideation that they had previously fought. Moreover, they argue that the highly publicized deaths of assisted death advocates are political acts.

Assisted suicide versus euthanasia

In the United States, assisted death is a practice by which a terminally ill person who is believed to be of sound mind  and has a prognosis of six months or less requests, obtains and – if they feel their suffering has become unbearable – self-administers barbiturates to end their life.

Euthanasia, which is practiced in Canada, Belgium, Colombia and the Netherlands, is a practice in which another person (generally a physician) acts to cause death. Euthanasia is illegal in the United States, whereas assisted death is currently authorized in ten states and the District of Columbia.

Public opinion
Public support for assisted death ranges from around 45% to 75% depending on how in-depth the questions are and how they are phrased. For instance, in "The Murky Issue of Whether The Public Supports Assisted Dying", reporter Katherine Sleeman noted:

"Not surprisingly, the acceptability of assisted dying varies according to the precise context ... a ComRes/Care poll in 2014 found that 73% agreed with the legalization of a bill which enables, "Mentally competent, adults in the UK who are terminally ill and have declared a clear and settled intention to end their own life, to be provided with assistance to commit suicide by self-administering lethal drugs." But 42% of these same people subsequently changed their minds when some of the empirical arguments against assisted dying were highlighted to them-such as the risk of pressure on people to end their lives so as not to be a burden on loved ones."

Gallup
In a May 2020 Gallup poll, 74% of U.S. adults say doctors should be allowed to end the life of a patient with an incurable disease "by some painless means" if the patient and the patient's family requests it."

In a May 2016 Gallup poll, 69% of Americans said they agree that "when a person has a disease that cannot be cured...doctors should be allowed by law to end the patient's life by some painless means if the patient and their family request it." The fact that the caveat in this poll is incurable illness rather than terminal illness represents one of the opponents' primary objections to assisted death.

In a May 2015 Gallup survey, 68% of Americans agreed that "individuals who are terminally ill ... have the right to choose to end their own life."

A 2014 Gallup survey found that 69% of Americans think that doctors should be allowed by law to end the life of a patient who has a disease that cannot be cured "by some painless means if the patient and their family request it."

Other surveys
In 2014, a Harris Poll found that 74% of Americans agree that "individuals who are terminally ill ... have the right to choose to end their own life."

17,000 U.S. doctors representing 28 medical specialities were surveyed by Medscape on end-of-life issues. The survey found that 54% of doctors believe assisted suicide, or medical aid in dying, should be available as an end-of-life option.

Advocates

Religious leaders
 Desmond Tutu
 George Carey

Actors
 Patrick Stewart
 Leonard Nimoy
 Olympia Dukakis
 Elliott Gould
 Montel Williams
 Florence Henderson

Public personalities
 George Will
 Derek Humphry
 Jack Kevorkian
 Diane Rehm
 Brittany Maynard
 Philip Nitschke
 Jeanne Phillips
 Betty Rollin
 Jane E. Brody
 Dolores Huerta

Opponents

Public personalities
 Dean Koontz
 Charles Krauthammer

Politicians
 Victoria Reggie Kennedy
 Ralph Nader
 Denise Provost

Lawyers
 Wesley J. Smith
 Harriet McBryde Johnson
 Shain Neumeier

Doctors
 Ira Byock

Activists
 Ari Ne'eman
 Marilyn Golden
 Lydia Brown
 Dominick Evans
 Corbett O'Toole
 Alice Wong (disability rights activist)

Actors
 Liz Carr
 Martin Sheen

Academics
 Rosemarie Garland-Thomson
 Paul K. Longmore
 Adrienne Asch

Supportive organizations
 American College of Legal Medicine
 American Medical Student Association
 American Medical Women's Association
 American Public Health Association
 Coalition for Liberty & Justice
 Compassion and Choices
 Death with Dignity National Center
 GLMA: Health Professionals Advancing LGBT Equality
 National Association of Social Workers
 Older Women's League
 American Nurses Association of California
 End of Life Washington
 Oregon Hospice and Palliative Hospice Association
 Triage Cancer

Neutral organizations
 American Academy of Hospice and Palliative Medicine
 American Society of Health-System Pharmacists
 American Psychological Association
 American Pharmacists Association
 Coalition for Compassionate Care of California
 California Hospice and Palliative Care Association
 California Medical Association
 Colorado Medical Society
 Hospice and Palliative Care Council of Vermont
 Kokua Mau (Hawaii)
 Missouri Hospice and Palliative Care Association
 Oncology Nursing Association
 Vermont Psychiatric Association
 Washington State Medical Association
 Washington State Psychological Association

Opposing organizations
 American Medical Association
 National Spinal Cord Injury Association
 World Association of Persons with Disabilities
 American Association of People with Disabilities
 Euthanasia Prevention Coalition
 National Council on Disability
 ADAPT
 National Council on Independent Living
 Patients Rights Action Fund
 LULAC
 Not Dead Yet
 Disability Rights Education and Defense Fund
 Arc of the United States
 TASH
 American Nursing Association
 Autistic Women & Nonbinary Network
 American College of Physicians
 Roman Catholic Church
 Islamic Medical Association of North America
 World Medical Association
 International Task Force on Euthanasia and Assisted Suicide (Patients Rights Council)

See also
 Baxter v. Montana
 Euthanasia in the United States
 Oregon Death with Dignity Act
 Suicide in the United States
 Washington Death with Dignity Act

References

External links
 Official Oregon Health Authority page on the DWDA with Annual Reports
 Official Washington State Department of Health page on the DWDA with Annual Reports
 Annotated Legal Cases on Physician-Assisted Suicide in the USA

 
Palliative care in the United States